Bolekhivtsi is a village (selo) in Drohobych Raion, Lviv Oblast, in south-west Ukraine. It belongs to Drohobych urban hromada, one of the hromadas of Ukraine.

From 1918 to 1939 the village was in Lwów Voivodeship in Poland.

References

External links
gska2.rada.gov.ua

Bolekhivtsi
Populated places in the Kingdom of Galicia and Lodomeria
Lwów Voivodeship